Xenocytaea maddisoni is a jumping spider.

Name
It is named after Wayne Maddison, a Salticid specialist of the University of British Columbia.

Description
Xenocytaea maddisoni is about 3.5 mm long, with females about 4 mm.

Distribution
Xenocytaea maddisoni is only known from Viti Levu, Fiji.

References
 Berry, J.W., Beatty, J.A. & Proszynski, J. (1998). Salticidae of the Pacific Islands. III. Distribution of Seven Genera, with Description of Nineteen New Species and Two New Genera. Journal of Arachnology 26(2):149-189. PDF

Salticidae
Endemic fauna of Fiji
Spiders of Fiji
Spiders described in 1998